Zephyrarchaea marae, the West Gippsland assassin spider, is a spider in the family Archaeidae. The species was first described by Michael G. Rix and Mark Harvey in 2012. It is endemic to Victoria in Australia.

Taxonomy 
The species specific name is a patronym in honour of Dr. Māra Blosfeld.

Description 
The males are 3.03 mm long, while the females are 3.95 mm long.

Distribution and habitat 
The species is known only from temperate rainforest and mesic closed forest habitats Dandenong and Strzelecki Ranges of West Gippsland, south and southeast of Melbourne.

Conservation 
The species is found throughout several national parks, and does not require any conservation action.

References 

Spiders described in 2012
Archaeidae